Frecciabianca is a high-speed train of the Italian national train operator, Trenitalia, and one of its Le Frecce brands (along with the more prestigious Frecciarossa and former Frecciargento). The name, which means "white arrow", was introduced in 2011; these services were previously known as Eurostar City Italia.

Routes
 Turin - Milan - Verona - Venice - Trieste
 Milan - Verona - Venice - Udine
 Turin - Genoa - La Spezia - Pisa - Livorno - Rome
 Rome - Naples - Salerno - Lamezia Terme - Reggio di Calabria
 Venice - Padua - Bologna - Rimini - Pesaro - Ancona - Pescara - Foggia - Bari - Lecce
 Milan - Piacenza - Parma - Reggio Emilia - Modena - Bologna - Rimini - Pesaro - Ancona - Pescara - Termoli - Foggia - Barletta - Bari - Lecce / Taranto
 Turin - Alessandria - Reggio Emilia - Bologna - Rimini - Ancona - Pescara - Foggia - Bari - Lecce
 Genoa - La Spezia - Pisa - Rome
 Palermo - Caltanissetta - Enna - Catania - Messina
 Milan - Ventimiglia

Rolling stock

See also
Frecciargento
Frecciarossa
High-speed rail in Italy
Eurostar Italia
Train categories in Europe

External links

References

High-speed rail in Italy
Ferrovie dello Stato Italiane